Mycena holoporphyra is a species of agaric fungus in the family Mycenaceae. It was first described by Miles Joseph Berkeley and Moses Ashley Curtis in 1868 as Agaricus holoporphyrus. Rolf Singer transferred it to the genus Mycena in 1962, where it is classified in the section Calodontes. First described from Cuba, it is also found in Trinidad, Africa, Mexico, and Central America and South America.

References

External links

holoporphyra
Fungi of Africa
Fungi of Central America
Fungi of Mexico
Fungi of the Caribbean
Fungi of South America
Fungi of Colombia
Fungi described in 1868
Taxa named by Miles Joseph Berkeley
Taxa named by Moses Ashley Curtis
Fungi without expected TNC conservation status